The Khangar community are an Indian community. They are referred to by many other names, such as Khangaar, Khungar, Khengar, Khagar, Khangdhar and Rao Khangad.

The community ruled areas of present-day Bundelkhand after the fall of the Chandelas in 1182 A.D. and until the mid-14th century Their seat of power was at Garh Kundar, a fort built by Khet Singh Khangar.

The Khangars were formerly classified as a criminal tribe under the Criminal Tribes Acts of the British Raj. They claim kshatriya status in the Hindu ritual ranking system known as varna but this is disputed. Other communities, such as the Bundelas, believe that such status is hereditary rather than acquired and that the Khangars were not thus born even though they did come to rule. During the period of the British Raj, when the process of sanskritisation became apparent and the administration attempted to record caste in censuses, the All-India Khangar Kshatriya League campaigned for official recognition as kshatriya.

References

Further reading

Denotified tribes of India
Social groups of Bihar
Social groups of Madhya Pradesh
Social groups of Rajasthan
Social groups of Uttar Pradesh